Acenario López or Agennatius López (died 1521) was a Roman Catholic prelate who served as Bishop of Santorini (1516–1521).

Biography
On 31 Mar 1516, Acenario López was appointed during the papacy of Pope Leo X as Bishop of Santorini.
He served as Bishop of Santorini until his death in 1521.

References 

16th-century Roman Catholic bishops in the Republic of Venice
Bishops appointed by Pope Leo X
1521 deaths